Tosaint Antony Ricketts (born 6 August 1987) is a Canadian former professional soccer player. He last played for the Vancouver Whitecaps FC and, until 2020, the Canada national team as a forward.

Club career

Early career 
Ricketts was one of the top short-distance runners in Alberta, and he began his youth career playing Division I soccer for the Green Bay Phoenix at University of Wisconsin Green Bay.

MyPa 
Ricketts joined Veikkausliiga club MyPa in 2009. He made his debut on 4 March 2009 and scored his first goal against Kuopion Palloseura on 13 June. He scored three goals in the Europa League against Politehnica Timișoara who became interested in signing him.

Politehnica Timișoara 
On 19 November 2010 Ricketts signed with Romanian club Politehnica Timișoara for three years. At his presentation at the press conference, he said: "I'm glad I signed with Poli, to me is a step forward in my career. I can't wait to play at my new team and I can't wait to reunite "Poli" fans, which impressed me when I played here in Europa League with MyPa-47". He chose the number 87. On 26 February 2011, Ricketts made his debut for Politehnica Timișoara at Dan Păltinişanu in a 3–1 win against Gaz Metan Mediaş. He played twenty minutes in the match after replacing injured Marián Čišovský. Ricketts scored his first goal for Politehnica Timișoara on 5 March 2011 against CFR Cluj. He scored the winning goal in the 78th minute. Politehnica Timișoara was bankrupted in the summer of 2012, and Ricketts was released from his contract.

Vålerenga 
On 31 August 2012, it was announced that Ricketts had signed for Vålerenga in the Norwegian Tippeligaen on a free transfer, he would be joining fellow Canadian international Lars Hirschfeld at the club. Ricketts made his debut in Norway as a second half sub for Torgeir Børven in a 1–0 defeat to Sogndal on 5 November 2012.

Sandnes Ulf 
In early January 2013 it was announced that Ricketts had signed with Sandnes Ulf allowing him to remain in the Tippeligaen. He made his debut for the club on 17 March in a 2–0 defeat to Strømsgodset. Ricketts played a total of 12 matches in Tippeligaen until he left Sandnes Ulf in September 2013, he also scored two goals for the club in the Norwegian Cup.

Bucaspor 
On 6 September 2013, Ricketts signed for Turkish First League club Bucaspor, a one-year contract with a one-year option. He scored his first two goals for the team in a 5–4 loss to Adana Demirspor on 22 September 2013.

Hapoel Haifa 
On 16 July 2014, Ricketts announced on Twitter he had signed for Israeli Premier League club Hapoel Haifa. He debuted with the side on 16 August 2014 in a Toto Cup match against Bnei Sakhnin, and scored a goal in an eventual 2–2 draw. He scored his first league goal against Beitar Jerusalem in a loss on 9 February 2015. In total, Ricketts made 30 appearances for the club, scoring a single goal. His lack of offensive production at the club can be attributed to being used as a defender for the entire season because of personnel issues on the roster.

Boluspor 
After one season in Israel, Ricketts returned to Turkey and signed with Boluspor on 3 August 2015. Ricketts left Boluspor in early 2016 after a dispute over unpaid wages.

Toronto FC 
On 20 July 2016, Ricketts returned to Canada to join Major League Soccer side Toronto FC. He made his debut from the bench in a 4–1 win against D.C. United, and scored his first goal in his next appearance: a 1–0 victory against Real Salt Lake City. He missed three games in the final weeks of the season due to a groin injury and indirect suspension.

In February 2017, Ricketts signed a two-year extension. On 13 May 2017, Ricketts scored a late brace in a 2–1 win at the Columbus Crew. The following game marked his first full 90 minutes for Toronto after 28 appearances, and he scored the final goal in a 3–2 victory at Minnesota United. In June, an injury sustained in the Canadian Championship semi-final second leg win against the Ottawa Fury kept him out for four matches.

At the conclusion of the 2018 season, Toronto declined the 2019 contract option on Ricketts.

Sūduva 
On 26 January 2019, Ricketts signed with defending Lithuanian A Lyga champions Sūduva. He scored a total of 10 goals for the club in the 2019 season, including a memorable goal in the 1–0 victory against Kauno Žalgiris on 16 March, which he dedicated to victims of terrorism following the Christchurch mosque shootings. Ricketts also earned five inclusions in the A Lyga Team of the Week. His final appearance for the club was during the UEFA Europa League second qualifying round, a 5–0 home victory against Tre Penne. Ricketts left Sūduva the following week after club's away victory in the Europa League third qualifying round game for a return to MLS.

Vancouver Whitecaps FC 
On 8 August 2019, Ricketts returned to MLS and Canada, joining Vancouver Whitecaps FC. He was re-signed to a new deal through 2022, with an option for 2023 in March 2022. At the end of the 2022 season, Vancouver announced they would not exercise the option on Ricketts' contract for 2023, ending his playing time with the club. Ricketts would continue in the front office as Manager of Community Impact

On January 31, 2023, Ricketts announced his retirement from soccer, joining the Whitecaps staff as liaison of club and player engagement.

International career 
In 2007 Ricketts was called up to the Canadian U-20 team for the 2007 FIFA U-20 World Cup held on home soil. He also made appearances for Canada in the 2008 CONCACAF Men's Pre-Olympic Tournament in which he scored twice against Guatemala.

In late January 2011, Ricketts was called up by Canada for the first time ahead of its international friendly against Greece on 9 February. Ricketts made his senior team debut for Canada as a late second half sub in this game which ended as a 1–0 loss. Ricketts was one of three Canadian players to make their international senior debut against Greece; Milan Borjan and David Edgar were the other two.

On 1 June 2011, Ricketts scored his first international goal, a stoppage time equalizer, in a 2–2 friendly match against Ecuador at BMO Field. Ricketts made his CONCACAF Gold Cup debut on 14 June in a 1–1 draw against Panama as a second half sub for Josh Simpson.

Ricketts continued his goal scoring form in World Cup Qualifying during his first ever start for the national team on 15 November 2011 during a 4–0 home victory over Saint Kitts and Nevis. Ricketts reached 10 goals for Canada on 16 June 2015 after scoring a brace against Dominica in 2018 FIFA World Cup qualifying. This tied him with Paul Peschisolido and Tomasz Radzinski for 9th all time on Canada's scoring charts.

Ricketts was named to the 2017 CONCACAF Gold Cup squad on 27 June 2017.

Style of play 
A fast striker, Ricketts is mainly known for his pace. His former Toronto FC manager Greg Vanney said of him in 2017: "He gives us presence, size, speed, a goal-scoring threat." Regarding his speed, movement, and work-rate, Vanney also added: "[Ricketts] is a relentless runner. A guy who will get behind defences. He's incredibly fast. He doesn't really need to run the line. He can give himself three, four lines of cushion and still make the runs in behind and still beat you to the spot." That same year, Neil Davidson of The National Post described him as the "fastest player on the Toronto roster," and also noted that "Ricketts’ speed unsettles defenders and he has an ability to find space in the penalty box. Get the ball to his feet or head and he can finish." Although normally a forward, he has also been deployed out of position in a more defensive role on occasion, often playing as a right–sided full-back or wing-back during his time with Israeli club Hapoel Haifa FC, due to injuries to other members of the squad in that position. He has also drawn praise in the media for his energy, presence in the air, and leadership, as well as his goalscoring rate, despite not being a particularly prolific player. Regarding his role on the pitch, Ricketts has commented: "I watch the tendencies of defenders, what spaces and weaknesses I can exploit and come second half I'm just waiting for any amount of time possible — if it's two, five, 15 minutes — to come on and provide that spark. It's just the mentality that comes along with the role I have."

Career statistics

Club

International 

Scores and results list Canada's goal tally first, score column indicates score after each Ricketts goal.

Honours 
Toronto FC
 MLS Cup: 2017
 Canadian Championship: 2017, 2018
 Supporters' Shield: 2017

Sūduva
 A Lyga: 2019
 Lithuanian Football Cup: 2019
 Lithuanian Supercup: 2019

Vancouver Whitecaps
Canadian Championship: 2022

References

External links 

 
 
 Tosaint Ricketts at Green Bay Athletics
 
 

1987 births
2011 CONCACAF Gold Cup players
2013 CONCACAF Gold Cup players
2015 CONCACAF Gold Cup players
2017 CONCACAF Gold Cup players
A Lyga players
Association football forwards
Black Canadian soccer players
Boluspor footballers
Bucaspor footballers
Canada men's international soccer players
Canada men's under-23 international soccer players
Canada men's youth international soccer players
Canadian expatriate soccer players
Canadian expatriate sportspeople in Finland
Canadian expatriate sportspeople in Israel
Canadian expatriate sportspeople in Lithuania
Canadian expatriate sportspeople in Norway
Canadian expatriate sportspeople in Romania
Canadian expatriate sportspeople in the United States
Canadian expatriate sportspeople in Turkey
Canadian sportspeople of Jamaican descent
Canadian soccer players
Eliteserien players
Expatriate footballers in Finland
Expatriate footballers in Israel
Expatriate footballers in Lithuania
Expatriate footballers in Norway
Expatriate footballers in Romania
Expatriate footballers in Turkey
Expatriate soccer players in the United States
FC Politehnica Timișoara players
FK Sūduva Marijampolė players
Green Bay Phoenix men's soccer players
Hapoel Haifa F.C. players
Israeli Premier League players
Liga I players
Liga II players
Living people
Major League Soccer players
Myllykosken Pallo −47 players
Sandnes Ulf players
Soccer players from Edmonton
TFF First League players
Toronto FC players
Vancouver Whitecaps FC players
Veikkausliiga players
Vålerenga Fotball players